Samlade Tider is a compilation album from pop group Gyllene Tider, released on April 20, 1994.

Track listing 
Himmel No. 7
Revolver upp
Ska vi älska, så ska vi älska till Buddy Holly
På jakt efter liv
Ljudet av ett annat hjärta
Leka med elden
(Kom så ska vi) Leva livet
Vän till en vän
Vandrar i ett sommarregn
Tylö Sun
Povel Ramel, Paul McCartney och jag
Lova att du aldrig glömmer bort mej

1994 compilation albums
Gyllene Tider compilation albums